Bruce F. Houghton (born 29 April 1950 in Auckland, New Zealand) is a New Zealand volcanologist. He was a student at Auckland University, and University of Otago, where he completed a PhD in 1977 on the geology of the Takatimu Mountains in western Southland.

Houghton is currently the Hawai'i State volcanologist and the Gordon A. Macdonald Professor of Volcanology at the University of Hawai'i.  In August 2017, Bruce was awarded the highest award in volcanology, the International Association of Volcanology and Chemistry of the Earth's Interior's Thorarinsson Medal. He is recognized as "a giant of volcanology".

Selected publications

References

External links
 
 

1950 births
Living people
New Zealand volcanologists
21st-century New Zealand geologists
University of Hawaiʻi faculty
University of Otago alumni
Thorarinsson Medalists
20th-century New Zealand geologists